Cuproxena auriculana is a species of moth of the family Tortricidae. It is found in Napo Province, Ecuador.

The wingspan is 20 mm. The ground colour of the forewings is ochreous cream and cream the along edges of costal blotch. The remaining areas are suffused with ferruginous. The hindwings are cream, tinged with ochreous in the apical portion.

Etymology
The species name refers to the large lobes of the sterigma and is derived from Latin auricula (meaning lobe of ear).

References

Moths described in 2007
Cuproxena
Moths of South America
Taxa named by Józef Razowski